For much of history, humans have used some form of cavalry for war and, as a result, cavalry tactics have evolved over time. Tactically, the main advantages of cavalry over infantry troops were greater mobility, a larger impact, and a higher position.

Predecessors

Chariot tactics had been the basis for using the horse in war. The chariot's advantage of speed was outdone by the agility of riding on horseback. The ability of horsemen to pass more difficult terrain was also crucial to this change. Horsemen supplanted most light chariots. In Celtic warfare, light chariots (essedum) persisted among mounted troops, for their ability to transport heavily armoured warriors and as mobile command platforms.

Riding and fighting on horseback

At first it was not considered effective to use weapons on horseback, but rather to use the horse as transportation. "Mounted infantry" would ride to battle, and then dismount to fight. For a long time, riders and charioteers worked alongside each other in the cavalry. Early domesticated horses were smaller and shorter than the warhorses of later history. Combined with a lack of developed cavalry tactics and the skittish nature of an untrained horse, fighting on horseback was unintuitive at first.

The first recorded instance of mounted warriors are the mounted archers of the Iranian tribes appearing in Assyrian records from the 9th century BC.

Mongolian troops had a Buryat bow, for showering the enemy with arrows from a safe distance. The aim on horseback was better than in a jiggling chariot, after it was discovered that the best time to shoot was while all the hooves of the horse were in the air. Nevertheless, an archer in a chariot could shoot potentially stronger infantry bows.

Javelins were employed as a powerful ranged weapon by many cavalries. They were easy to handle on horseback. Up to ten javelins would be carried, depending on their size and weight. Thrown javelins have less range than arrows, but often prevailed in use nevertheless, due to the mass of the weapon, there was a greater armour-piercing capability and usually inflicted fatal wounds more frequently than arrows. Usage is reported for both light cavalry and heavy cavalry, for example, by the Numidia and Mongol light cavalry, and the Celtic, Cataphract, and Mamluk heavy cavalry. The Celtic horsemen's training was copied by the Roman equites. A significant element learned from the Celts was turning on horseback to throw javelins backwards, similar to the Parthian shot with bow and arrows.

Stirrups and spurs improved the ability of riders to act fast and securely in melées and manoeuvres demanding agility of the horse, but their employment was not unquestioned; ancient shock cavalry performed quite satisfactorily without them.  Modern historical reenactors have shown that neither the stirrup nor the saddle are strictly necessary for the effective use of the couched lance, refuting a previously widely held belief.  Free movement of the rider on horseback were highly esteemed for light cavalry to shoot and fight in all directions, and contemporaries regarded stirrups and spurs as inhibiting for this purpose. Andalusian light cavalry refused to employ them until the 12th century, nor were they used by the Baltic turcopoles of the Teutonic Order in the battle of Legnica (1241).

An example of combined arms and the efficiency of cavalry forces were the Medieval Mongols. Important for their horse archery was the use of stirrups for the archer to stand while shooting. This new position enabled them to use larger and stronger cavalry bows than the enemy.

Tactics of light cavalry using bows

Armies of horse archers could cover enemy troops with arrows from a distance and never had to engage in close combat. Slower enemies without effective long range weapons often had no chance against them. It was in this manner that the cavalry of the Parthian Empire destroyed the troops of Marcus Licinius Crassus (53 BC) in the Battle of Carrhae. During their raids in Central and Western Europe during the 9th and 10th centuries, Magyar mounted archers spread terror in West Francia and East Francia; a prayer from Modena pleads de sagittis Hungarorum libera nos, domine ("From the arrows of the Hungarians, deliver us, Lord")

Another fairly popular tactic was known as "shower shooting".
The Sassanid Persians and the Mamluks were the chief proponents of the idea, although Muslim cavalry in India had also been known to use it in battle. It involved a line of fairly well-armoured cavalrymen (often on armoured horses) standing in a massed static line, or advancing in an ordered formation at the walk while loosing their arrows as quickly as possible. It was very effective against unsteady enemies who could easily be unnerved by the sight of a vast cloud of arrows raining down upon them; however, an enemy provided with good armour and discipline would often be able to hold out at least temporarily against the barrage. A case in point is Procopius's accounts of Belisarius's wars against the Sassanids where he states how the Byzantine cavalry engaged in massed archery duels against their Persian counterparts. The Persians loosed their arrows with far greater frequency, but as their bows were much weaker, they did not do much damage compared to the stronger Roman bows.

The great weakness of mounted archers was their need of space and their light equipment (compared to contemporary heavy cavalry). If they were forced to fight in close combat against better armoured enemies, they usually lost. Furthermore, they were not suited for participating in sieges. For example, although victorious in the field the Mongols originally had been unable to take the fortified Chinese cities until they managed to capture and enlist the services of Islamic siege engineers. The Mongols subsequently failed to retake Hungary in 1280 after the Hungarians became more focused on Western European heavy cavalry and castle building. Good cavalry troops needed much training and very good horses. Many peoples who engaged in this form of classical cavalry, such as the Hungarians and Mongols, practically lived on horseback.

The Battle of Dorylaeum (1097) during the First Crusade shows the advantages and disadvantages of mounted archers; the rider groups of the Seljuk sultan, Kilij Arslan I, were able to surround an army of Crusaders and shoot them from a distance. Suddenly, reinforcements under the command of Godfrey of Bouillon arrived, and the Seljuks themselves were encircled. They could no longer escape and were annihilated in close combat. The defeat of the Seljuks at Dorylaeum was so complete that the Crusaders then crossed Anatolia virtually unchallenged.

Tactics of heavy cavalry using lances

Medieval European knights attacked in several different ways, implementing shock tactics if possible, but always in formations of several knights, not individually. For defense and mêlée a formation of horsemen was as tight as possible next to each other in a line. This prevented their enemy from charging, and also from surrounding them individually. The most devastating charging method was to ride in a looser formation fast into attack. This attack was often protected by simultaneous or shortly preceding ranged attacks of archers or crossbowmen. The attack began from a distance of about 350 metres and took about 15–20 seconds to cross the contemporary long range weapon's effective distance. A most important element, and one not easily mastered, was to stay in one line with fixed spaces while accelerating and having the maximum speed at impact. Often knights would come in several waves, with the first being the best equipped and armored. The lance as a primary weapon pierced the enemy. If an enemy soldier was hit in full gallop by a knight's lance couched under the armpit, he was thrown backwards with such a momentum that he knocked over several of his compatriots, and was more often than not, killed; in some cases, the lance would even skewer the man and kill or wound the soldier behind him. The heavy lances were dropped after the attack and the battle was continued with secondary weapons (swords, battle-axes, war-hammers, or maces).

The Persians deployed their cataphracts in mixed formations with light archers in the rear ranks, supporting the charge with arrows. Mongolian heavy cavalry improved upon the charging effect by attaching hooks to their lances to take enemies down when bypassing. Usually, employed a two-ranks deep formation of heavy cavalry charging the enemy. They were supported by three ranks of light cavalry, delivering rapid closeup shots with heavy armour-breaking arrows. Chinese and Japanese cavalry often used polearms. Both handled their primary weapons in the two-handed Asian style. This method of charging attack was very effective, but it depended very much on favourable ground on the chosen battlefield.

Many knights during Medieval battles fought on foot. Attacks would be carried out on horseback only under favorable conditions. If the enemy infantry was equipped with polearms and fought in tight formations it was not possible to charge without heavy losses. A fairly common solution to this was for the men-at-arms to dismount and assault the enemy on foot, such as the way Scottish knights dismounted to stiffen the infantry schiltron or the English combination of longbowmen with dismounted men-at-arms in the Hundred Years' War. Another possibility was to bluff an attack, but turn around before impact. This tempted many infantrymen to go on the chase, leaving their formation. The heavy cavalry then turned around again in this new situation and rode down the scattered infantry. Such a tactic was deployed in the Battle of Hastings (1066).

A further improvement of fighting ability was the use of well-armed infantry reserves during knightly battles on horseback. After some time, the battle would often split into several small groups, with space in between, and both sides would become exhausted. Then, an infantry rush could concentrate on selected targets and rout the enemy. Infantry also helped knights to remount in battle and aided the wounded.

The Polish-Lithuanian hussars' primary battle tactic was the charge. They carried the charge to, and through the enemy. The charge started at a slow pace and in a relatively loose formation. The formation gradually gathered pace and closed ranks while approaching the enemy, and reached its highest pace and closest formation immediately before engagement. They tended to repeat the charge several times until the enemy formation broke (they had supply wagons with spare lances). The tactic of a charge by heavily armoured hussars and horses was effective for nearly two centuries. The hussars fought with long lances (a hussar's lance usually ranged from 4.5 to 6.2 metres in length), a koncerz (thrusting sword), a szabla (sabre), one or two pistols and often with a carbine or arquebus, known in Polish as a bandolet. Winged hussars also carried other weapons, such as a nadziak type of war hammer and battleaxes. The lighter, Turkish-style saddle, allowed for more armour to be used by both the horses and the warriors. Moreover, the horses were bred to run very fast with a heavy load and to recover quickly. This was achieved by breeding old Polish horses with Eastern horses, usually from Tatar tribes. As a result, these horses could walk hundreds of kilometres, loaded with over 100 kilograms and still be able to charge in an instant. Also, hussar horses were very quick and manoeuvrable. This allowed hussars to fight with any cavalry or infantry force, from Western heavy kissaiers, to quick Tatars. They were widely regarded as the most powerful cavalry in the world. In the battles of Lubiszew in 1577, Byczyna (1588), Kokenhausen (1601), Kircholm (1605), Kłuszyn (1610), Chocim (1621), Martynów (1624), 
Trzciana (1629), Ochmatów (1644), 
Beresteczko (1651), Połonka (1660), Cudnów (1660), Chocim (1673), Lwów (1675), Vienna (1683) and Párkány (1683), the Polish-Lithuanian hussars proved to be the decisive factor, often against overwhelming odds. For instance, in the Battle of Kłuszyn, during the Polish-Muscovite War, the Russians and Swedes outnumbered the commonwealth army five-to-one, yet were soundly defeated.

Tactics of heavy cavalry using bows and javelins

Attempts at integrating ranged weapons and heavy cavalry were, for example, made by the Greeks and Persians, equipping their heavier cavalry with bows and javelins. Prior to charging, the enemy would be weakened by repeated missile attacks from combined light cavalry and heavy cavalry (cataphracts). This tactical system was adopted by the Romans, as attested by the presence of an "equites sagittarii clibanarii" unit in the Notitia Dignitatum, and passed down into the tactical repertoire of their Byzantine successors.

An enemy who could suddenly strike and retreat using guerilla warfare tactics was a serious problem for the heavy cavalry. It was therefore important to have enough light cavalry to support the heavier mounted units.

As mentioned earlier, heavy cavalry with lances were always supported by ranged combat units. They could be heavily armoured archers, like cataphracts or clibanarii with bows, advancing together with the charging cavalry. This bow-armed cavalry could loose their arrows as they advanced in the early stages of their charge with the intention of weakening and demoralizing the enemy formation prior to the moment of shock, possibly in shower shooting style. While the enemy was usually capable of countering with equal measures of ranged combat, the horse archers often wore protective equipment, so the changeover from light to heavy cavalry is not always clear and it seems in cases they formed the second charging rank. A similar tactic of heavy skirmishers developed in Late Medieval Europe, employing the easier to handle crossbow. Frontal assaults of heavy cavalry became considered ineffective against formations of spearmen or pikemen combined with crossbowmen or longbow archers. Most of the cavalrymen wore armour that could be penetrated by contemporary crossbows at close ranges. It resulted in the development of new cavalry tactics, whereby knights and mounted mercenaries, deployed in deep triangular wedges, with the most heavily armoured men (especially those able to afford armoured horses) being deployed in the front ranks. To increase its effect, part of the formation would carry small, powerful all-metal crossbows of their own. These mounted crossbowmen could sally out from the rear ranks to provide a skirmish screen or a preliminary barrage of bolts.

Later on, the tactical landscape featured harquebusiers, musketeers and pikemen, deployed in combined-arms formations and pitted against cavalry firing pistols or carbines. One of the cavalry tactics employed in such encounters was the caracole,  developed in the mid-16th century in an attempt to integrate gunpowder weapons into cavalry tactics. Equipped with one or two wheellock pistols, cavalrymen would advance on their target at less than a gallop. As each rank came into range, the soldiers would turn away, discharge their pistols at the target, retire to reload and then repeat the manoeuvre. Early on, they had an advantage in firepower, but infantry firepower eventually increased. With the invention of the bayonet, the pike screen against charges could also be turned into a rank of firing soldiers. This tactic was accompanied by the increasing popularity of the German reiters in European armies from about 1540, or similar equipped, but usually more lightly armoured hakkapeliitta. Their main weapons were two or more pistols and a sword; initially,  most wore three-quarters armour, though as time passed this was reduced to a helmet and a cuirass over a leather coat; sometimes they also carried a long cavalry firearm known as an arquebus or a carbine (although this type of horsemen soon became regarded as a separate class of cavalry – the arquebusier or, in Britain, harquebusier).

Modern historians regard the caracole as a tactical system that ultimately proved ineffective.  It sacrificed the cavalry advantages of speed and mobility, while also leaving mounted soldiers at a disadvantage to massed infantry equipped with heavier and longer-ranged weapons. The caracole gave way to close artillery support (see Horse artillery), deployed to break up the infantry formations and force the foot soldiers to scatter, so that the cavalry would regain their advantage in close-quarters combat. Contemporary writers did not seem to have used the term "caracole" in its modern sense; John Cruso, for example, explained it as a manoeuvre whereby a formation of cuirassiers would receive the enemy's charge by splitting apart to either side, and then charging back into the flanks of the overextended enemy.

Some historians associate the demise of the caracole with the name of Gustavus Adolphus of Sweden (1594–1632). He regarded the technique as fairly inefficient and forbade the cavalry regiments in Swedish employment from using it.  However, he was definitely not the first military commander to dismiss the caracole; François de la Noue, in his account of his service under Henry IV of France, mentioned that the pistol-armed Protestant cavalry used their weapons much like very long swords or lances, charging fiercely against the enemy formation before discharging the pistols at point-blank range (or even laying the pistol's muzzle directly against the opponent's armour before firing).  There is reason to believe that the Sweders were influenced by Henry IV's ideas, whether directly or through Dutch mediation – especially by the agency of Swedish officers who served in the Low Countries (Eighty Years' War), such as Jacob De la Gardie.

Infantry countertactics
Against light cavalry with bows and javelins

It was impossible for infantry to engage light cavalry with bows and javelins in close combat on ground that did not seriously hinder cavalry movement. The only resort for engagement were missile weapons in ranged combat. In this case both cavalry and infantry fought only in a missile exchange. While the infantry can be considered static in comparison to the cavalry, their own protection, the damage their missiles would cause and the hit rate were important.

For example, in the prelude to the Battle of Mohi, crossbowmen protected by pavises sniped at the Mongol light cavalry, resulting in a tactical defeat of this Mongol unit, although the Mongols did go on to win the overall battle.

The defence of such ranged combat units was important, for cavalry could always switch roles and engage the ranged combat infantry (often lightly armored skirmishers) in close combat.

Against heavy cavalry with lances

The longbow and the crossbow were able to counter the dominance of mounted knights on the battlefield. Although knights of the Middle Ages often fought on foot or at least avoided futile frontal attacks, it happened several times that knightly armies led charges in obeyance to their warrior ideal only to meet with disaster. At Crécy (1346) and Poitiers (1356), the French knights suffered heavy casualties against the Welsh and English longbowmen. The ability to keep several arrows in the air at any given time was an important advantage of the medieval archer. Thus, while a cavalry charge followed a strict pattern of acceleration (400 metres in 2 minutes, gallop at the last 150 metres) from a distance beyond effective missile range, once they came within range they could be met with a hail of arrows that could severely injure both horse and rider alike. However, unsupported light infantry and archers would not be able to cause enough casualties to a cavalry force, if it were charging across suitable terrain, to tip the odds in their favour in the following melee. Thus, it was always advisable for missile troops to fight on terrain disadvantageous to cavalry charges, and with supporting heavy infantry close by.

The long spears (pikes) of the Scots and Swiss were an excellent defensive weapon against cavalry. The warriors stood in tight formations like an ancient phalanx, the end of their pikes embedded in the ground, presenting a massive spiked wall. In battle against the Scots, the English knights proved to be as narrow-minded as their French counterparts, employing the classic cavalry charge despite the new challenge of the Scottish pike. In the battles of Stirling Bridge (1297) and Bannockburn (1314) they were defeated by the Scots. While the English imitated this tactic successfully against the French, the Swiss perfected it. Despite longer lances for the knights, this formation was now almost impenetrable. Pikemen with polearms remained an important part of armies throughout the Thirty Years' War. Later tactics used against this formation included caracole maneuvers with ranged weapons. However, a well-trained cavalry force could outflank a force of enemy pikemen on even terrain and triumph. The most elite knights, with the best armour, immense prowess and extremely-well trained horses, could charge pike formations and still, even if only scarcely, hold their own, sometimes even triumphing; however, the cost to raise and maintain such troops was enormous and impractical when considering alternative options to the head-on charge.

Lancers needed firm even ground and ample unobstructed space for a cavalry charge to be effective. Opponents could limit avenues for such charges by deploying their forces near rivers, marshes, woodlands, or other types of rough terrain. The later Roman generals were able to defeat the Parthian Cataphracts by securing their flanks. The Scots did this at Bannockburn and Stirling, and in nearly all their guerilla fighting against the English, as did the Welsh to a great extent. The Swiss defeated the Austrian knights at the Battle of Morgarten (1315) by attacking the knightly army in a narrow place between an acclivity and a swamp. The peasants of Dithmarschen faced in 1500, at Hemmingstedt, the army of the Danish king. They opened the dykes and flooded the country. If the terrain was not well suited for a cavalry attack, knights often fought on foot and used their lances as pikes.

New tactics of light cavalry and mounted infantry
With increasing firepower and no sufficient protection, the role of cavalry on the battlefield was slowly reduced. Light cavalry with firearms could return fire, but the aim from a moving platform was not as good as for infantry. So most important for cavalry was the ability to quickly attack enemy cavalry or scattered infantry with lances and sabres. Speed reduced the time vulnerable to gunfire, but still closed formations became impossible to defeat. This tactic was a striking surprise of Mongolian light cavalry in the battle of the Kalka River. The alternative was to use them as dragoons, reaching their positions quickly, dismounting, and fighting like infantry, often with projectile weapons. Such a way of fighting had started in Europe at least in the mid-13th century with mounted longbow and crossbow archers, but was also employed by the Mongols with their Buryatian longbows.

Cavalry in modern warfare

Cavalry is featured in modern warfare with cavalrymen retaining the light cavalry missions, albeit with but the missions of reconnaissance and security remain the same. Heavy cavalry, as such, has its role of shock effect fulfilled by tanks and other armoured fighting vehicles.

Since the early 20th century, the use of horses and other animals for frontline cavalry has been largely supplanted by infantry fighting vehicles and armored cars. The first regular cavalry unit to mechanize was the 11th Hussars of the British Army, switching from horses to armored cars in 1928. Since then, many cavalry units have mechanized and switched to armored vehicles and armed helicopters, with horses only being used for ceremonial purposes, if not phased out of service entirely. However, some modern units, such as the Indian Army's 61st Cavalry and some People's Liberation Army's border units in Xinjiang and Inner Mongolia, continue to use horses on deployments.

Examples of modern military vehicles built specifically for the cavalry role include the M3 Bradley CFV and the M113 ACAV.

Air cavalry 
Air cavalry, originally sky cavalry is a United States Army term that refers to helicopter-equipped units that perform reconnaissance, security, and economy-of-force missions. The term and unit designation properly only refers to those squadrons (i.e., battalion-level organizations), and some independent troops (i.e., companies), affiliated with historical U.S. cavalry regiments, that perform the traditional cavalry mission. After the Vietnam War, there also existed one independent brigade-sized air cavalry organization, the 6th Air Cavalry Combat Brigade.

U.S. air cavalry squadrons consisted of three air cavalry troops, one armored cavalry troop, and a headquarters and headquarters troop. The air cavalry troops consisted of an aero-scout platoon, an aero-weapons platoon, an aero-rifle platoon, a service platoon, and a headquarters and operations platoon. The troop was commanded by a major, with a captain as executive officer, and a troop first sergeant. Each platoon was commanded by a captain with a lieutenant as assistant platoon commander/section leader and a sergeant first class as platoon sergeant.

War elephants

Elephant cavalry first appeared three thousand years ago, simultaneously in India's Vedic Civilization and in China. Female Asian elephants were used, sometimes in small groups, sometimes in vast regiments of thousands of animals in the 13th century, primarily to produce a tactical "shock and awe" effect in the field. In addition, the large animals provided elevated platforms from which archers could rain down arrows on the enemy, and from which generals could survey the battle.

The psychological effect of war elephants was often their main tactical use. After encountering elephant cavalry in the Battle of the Hydaspes River, Alexander the Great's troops mutinied and refused to press further into India. However, the animals were often not tractable in battle, and when faced with determined opponents, would often flee and trample their own infantry in their flight.

Horse cavalry developed tent pegging tactics to deal with elephant cavalry. If they maintained their nerve in the face of the larger mounts, horse cavalry could rout elephant cavalry, especially by moving into close quarters and attacking the elephants' vulnerable feet. The Mongols would loose arrows at their enemy elephants' feet and legs until the elephants ran and trampled over their own army.

Dromedary and camel cavalry

Next to elephants, camels were the tallest and heaviest animals available for cavalry. They are neither as agile nor as fast as horses. Their use as riding animals, reported from the battle of Qarqar, was more frequent than horses in ancient times. Their advantage was that while they were standing, a mounted archer could aim and shoot with a strong bow from behind an infantry formation. Camels equipped with small cannons gave the Afghan troops an advantage during the third battle of Panipat. Another advantage was their effect on horses, if the horses had never before encountered camels. In the battle of Pterium experienced Lydian cavalry suddenly had to struggle with their horses panicking, when trying to face an attack of dromedary riders. The psychological effect of the best trained and most reliable soldiers being overrun in confusion decided the battle. Major powers of Europe, Africa and Asia were preparing for engagement in this war. It is not known whether after this incident war horses were prepared to face camels and dromedaries.

References

Polybius World History
German Wikipedia, partly translated article
Cavalry Tactics during the Napoleonic Wars

External links
 American Civil War: US cavalry tactics ("Cooke's Cavalry Tactics (1862)")

Tactics
 Tactics
Military tactics